L1-norm principal component analysis (L1-PCA) is a general method for multivariate data analysis.
L1-PCA is often preferred over standard L2-norm principal component analysis (PCA) when the analyzed data may contain outliers (faulty values or corruptions).

Both L1-PCA and standard PCA seek a collection of orthogonal directions (principal components) that define a subspace wherein data representation is maximized according to the selected criterion.
Standard PCA quantifies data representation as the aggregate of the L2-norm of the data point projections into the subspace, or equivalently the aggregate Euclidean distance of the original points from their subspace-projected representations.
L1-PCA uses instead the aggregate of the L1-norm of the data point projections into the subspace. In PCA and L1-PCA, the number of principal components (PCs) is lower than the rank of the analyzed matrix, which coincides with the dimensionality of the space defined by the original data points.
Therefore, PCA or L1-PCA are commonly employed for dimensionality reduction for the purpose of data denoising or compression.
Among the advantages of standard PCA that contributed to its high popularity are low-cost computational implementation by means of singular-value decomposition (SVD) and statistical optimality when the data set is generated by a true multivariate normal data source.

However, in modern big data sets, data often include corrupted, faulty points, commonly referred to as outliers.
Standard PCA is known to be sensitive to outliers, even when they appear as a small fraction of the processed data.
The reason is that the L2-norm formulation of L2-PCA places squared emphasis on the magnitude of each coordinate of each data point, ultimately overemphasizing peripheral points, such as outliers. 
On the other hand, following an L1-norm formulation, L1-PCA places linear emphasis on the coordinates of each data point, effectively restraining outliers.

Formulation 
Consider any matrix  consisting of  -dimensional data points. Define . For integer  such that , L1-PCA is formulated as:

In-(), L1-norm  returns the sum of the absolute entries of its argument and L2-norm  returns the sum of the squared entries of its argument.

The maximization metric in  can be expanded as

Solution 

That is, define

Procrustes Theorem states that if  has SVD , then 
.

Markopoulos, Karystinos, and Pados showed that, if  is the exact solution to the binary nuclear-norm maximization (BNM) problem 

then 

The nuclear-norm  in  returns the summation of the singular values of its matrix argument and can be calculated by means of standard SVD. Moreover, it holds that, given the solution to L1-PCA, the solution to BNM can be obtained as 

where  returns the -sign matrix of its matrix argument (with no loss of generality, we can consider ). In addition, it follows that . Therefore, its exact solution can be found through exhaustive evaluation of all  elements of its feasibility set, with asymptotic cost . Therefore, L1-PCA can also be solved, through BNM, with cost  (exponential in the product of the number of data points with the number of the sought-after components).

Algorithms

Exact solution of exponential complexity 

As shown above, the exact solution to L1-PCA can be obtained by the following two-step process: 
 1.
 2.

Exact solution of polynomial complexity 

Approximate efficient solvers 

This iterative method was later generalized for  components. Another approximate efficient solver was proposed by McCoy and Tropp by means of semi-definite programming (SDP). Most recently, L1-PCA (and BNM in ) were solved efficiently by means of bit-flipping iterations (L1-BF algorithm).

L1-BF algorithm 

  1  function L1BF():
  2      Initialize  and 
  3      Set  and 
  4      Until termination (or  iterations)
  5          , 
  6          For 
  7              , 
  8                              // flip bit
  9                             // calculated by SVD or faster (see)
 10              if 
 11                  , 
 12                  
 13              end
 14              if                     // no bit was flipped
 15                  if 
 16                      terminate
 17                  else
 18                      

Complex data 

L1-PCA has also been generalized to process complex data. For complex L1-PCA, two efficient algorithms were proposed in 2018.

Tensor data 

L1-PCA has also been extended for the analysis of tensor data, in the form of L1-Tucker, the L1-norm robust analogous of standard Tucker decomposition. Two algorithms for the solution of L1-Tucker are L1-HOSVD and L1-HOOI.

Code 

MATLAB code for L1-PCA is available at MathWorks and other repositories.

References 

Data analysis